This is a list of women writers who were born in Ghana or  whose writings are closely associated with that country.

A
 Ama Ata Aidoo (1940– ), playwright, poet, fiction writer and critic
Mary Asabea Ashun (1968–), novelist and educator
Portia Arthur (born 1990), author, writer and reporter
 Ayesha Harruna Attah (born 1983), novelist

B
 Yaba Badoe (born 1955), novelist and filmmaker
 Elizabeth-Irene Baitie (born 1970), writer of young adult fiction
 Roseanne A. Brown (born 1995), novelist 
 Margaret Busby, publisher and dramatist
 Abena Busia (1953– ), poet and academic
 Akosua Busia (1966– ), actress, novelist and screenwriter

C
 Adelaide Casely-Hayford (1868–1960), short story writer and educator
 Gladys May Casely-Hayford (1901–1950), poet

D
 Mabel Dove Danquah (1910–1984), short story writer and journalist
 Meri Nana-Ama Danquah (born 1967), memoirist
 Amma Darko (born 1956), novelist

G
 Yaa Gyasi (born 1989), novelist

H
 Afua Hirsch (born 1981), journalist

L
 Lesley Lokko, novelist and academic

M 

 Peace Adzo Medie, novelist and academic

O
 Nana Oforiatta Ayim, novelist, art historian and filmmaker
 Mercy Adoma Owusu-Nimoh (1936–2011), children's writer, publisher, educationist and politician

S
 Taiye Selasi (born 1979), novelist
 Efua Sutherland (1924–1996), playwright
 Esi Sutherland-Addy, academician, writer, educationalist, and human rights activist

W 

 Mamle Wolo, novelist, short story writer

See also
 List of women writers
 List of Ghanaian writers

References

-
Ghanaian
Writers
Writers, women